Shinkichi Takemura (21 December 1931 – 9 December 1999) was a Japanese speed skater. He competed at the 1956 Winter Olympics and the 1960 Winter Olympics.

References

1931 births
1999 deaths
Japanese male speed skaters
Olympic speed skaters of Japan
Speed skaters at the 1956 Winter Olympics
Speed skaters at the 1960 Winter Olympics
Sportspeople from Nagano Prefecture
20th-century Japanese people